François De Keersmaecker (born 12 April 1958 in Willebroek) was the president of the Royal Belgian Football Association (URBSFA/KBVB) from 24 June 2006 until 24 June 2017. In that function he has been actively committed in the candidacy of Belgium and the Netherlands as host countries for the 2018 World Cup.

François De Keersmaecker is a law graduate and he is a lawyer in Mechelen.

Apart from being the Belgian Football Association president he is also member of the Council for Marketing and Television from the FIFA since July 1, 2007 and second vice-president from the Juridical Commission of the UEFA since July 1, 2007. Earlier functions that François De Keersmaecker carried in the Belgian FA were president of the Provincial Committee from Antwerp from December 12, 1987, till August 22, 1996, member of the Sports Committee from September 12, 1986, until December 11 1987, member of the Provincial Committee from Antwerp from October 25, 1985, till 11 September 1986 and referee in the Provincial Referee Commission from Antwerp from November 24, 1980, till October 24, 1985.

References

1958 births
Living people
Belgian footballers
FIFA officials
People from Willebroek
Association footballers not categorized by position
Sportspeople from Antwerp Province
20th-century Belgian people